"Yankee Doodle" is a well-known Anglo-American song and the state anthem of Connecticut.

Yankee Doodle may also refer to:

Cinema and television
Yankee Doodle in Berlin, a 1919 silent film
Yankee Doodle Dandy, a 1942 American biographical musical film about George M. Cohan
Yankee Doodle Doctor, a M*A*S*H television episode

Cartoons
The Yankee Doodle Mouse, a 1943 Tom and Jerry cartoon
Yankee Doodle Bugs, a 1954 Bugs Bunny cartoon
Yankee Doodle Daffy, a 1943 Daffy Duck cartoon
Yankee Doodle Pigeon, also known as Dastardly and Muttley in Their Flying Machines, a Hanna-Barbera Productions cartoon

Food
Yankee Doodles, a chocolate cupcake snack sold in the United States
Yankee Doodle Coffee Shop, a diner in New Haven, Connecticut

Music 
"Dixie Doodle", a parody of "Yankee Doodle", written in 1862
"The Yankee Doodle Boy", a song from the 1942 film

Places
Billerica, the official "Yankee Doodle Town"

Other
Yankee Doodle (NX4769), a Lockheed Vega aircraft that set North American transcontinental speed records in 1927 and 1928

